General elections were held in Anguilla on 15 March 1976. The result was a victory for the People's Progressive Party, which won six of the seven seats in the House of Assembly.

Background
The elections were the first held under a new constitution, which provided for a Legislative Assembly with seven elected members, two appointed members and three ex-officio members (the Attorney General, Chief Secretary and Financial Secretary) and a Speaker.

Results
Everet Romney and Clive Smith were appointed as the nominated members.

References

Elections in Anguilla
Anguilla
1976 in Saint Kitts-Nevis-Anguilla
March 1976 events in North America
Election and referendum articles with incomplete results